Belarus competed at the 2014 Winter Paralympics in Sochi, Russia, held between 7–16 March 2014.

Biathlon 

Men

Women

Cross-country skiing 

Men

Women

Relay

See also
Belarus at the Paralympics
Belarus at the 2014 Winter Olympics

References

Nations at the 2014 Winter Paralympics
2014
Winter Paralympics